is a private junior college in Moriguchi, Osaka, Japan

History 
It was chartered as a junior college in 1962 for women only. with the Department of Homemaking Studies. In April 2002, the junior college was renamed Osaka International College. In April 2008, the junior college became coeducational.

Courses
It offers courses in life design, food nutrition, and childcare.

See also 
 Osaka International University
 List of junior colleges in Japan

References

External links 
  

Educational institutions established in 1962
Japanese junior colleges
1962 establishments in Japan
Universities and colleges in Osaka Prefecture
Private universities and colleges in Japan